The '1924–25 Austrian First League season was the fourteenth season of top-tier football in Austria. It was contested by 11 teams playing a 20-game season. Hakoah Vienna's goalkeeper scored the championship-winning goal against Wiener AC. This was also the first year in which professionalism was introduced to the league.

League standings

Results

References
Austria - List of final tables (RSSSF)

Austrian Football Bundesliga seasons
Austria
1924–25 in Austrian football